Tyrinthia is a genus of longhorn beetles of the subfamily Lamiinae, containing the following species:

 Tyrinthia aurantia Martins & Galileo, 2007
 Tyrinthia biformis Bates, 1885
 Tyrinthia capillata Bates, 1866
 Tyrinthia colombiana Galileo & Martins, 2009
 Tyrinthia dionae Martins & Galileo, 2004
 Tyrinthia frontalis (Guérin-Méneville, 1855)
 Tyrinthia klugii (Thomson, 1868)
 Tyrinthia lycinella Bates, 1881
 Tyrinthia moroiuba Martins & Galileo, 1991
 Tyrinthia nigroapicata Galileo & Martins, 2009
 Tyrinthia obtusa Bates, 1881
 Tyrinthia paraba Martins & Galileo, 1991
 Tyrinthia patula Galileo & Martins, 2005
 Tyrinthia photurina Bates, 1885
 Tyrinthia picticornis Martins & Galileo, 1991
 Tyrinthia scissifrons Bates, 1866
 Tyrinthia turuna Martins & Galileo, 1993
 Tyrinthia xanthe Bates, 1881

References

Hemilophini